The Nautsiyoki is a river in the north of the Kola Peninsula in Murmansk Oblast, Russia. The river originates in the Lake Ala-Nautsiyarvi and flows into the Paatsjoki. Its biggest tributary is the Kokhisevanjoki.

Rivers of Murmansk Oblast
Paatsjoki basin